Amboy is an unincorporated community in San Bernardino County, in California's Mojave Desert, west of Needles and east of Ludlow on historic Route 66. As of 2020, the town's business district still contained a post office, a historic restaurant-motel, and a Route 66 tourist shop, all operated by the town's population of four people.

Geography
The town is south of the Granite Mountains, Providence Mountains, and the Mojave National Preserve. Adjacent to the south is the landmark Amboy Crater, and beyond to the southeast the Bullion Mountains. To the south is Bristol Dry Lake and the community of Cadiz, California.

Amboy was once a major stop along the famous Route 66, but has seen much lower visitation since the opening of Interstate 40 to the north in 1973. Amboy is home to Roy's Motel and Café, a Route 66 landmark.

The town has a total of 10 surviving buildings and a population of far fewer than the advertised 20. According to the Los Angeles Times, the town's population is approximately four. A resident interviewed in a short 2014 documentary also gives the population as four, all of whom are men. Amboy is located in ZIP code 92304 and area codes 442 and 760.

History

Although Amboy was first settled in 1858, the town was not established until 1883. Lewis Kingman, a locating engineer for the Atlantic and Pacific Railroad, created the town as the first of a series of alphabetical railroad stations that were to be constructed across the Mojave Desert. The name was probably taken from a location in the eastern United States.

In 1926, Amboy became a boom town after the opening of U.S. Route 66. In 1938, Roy's Motel and Café opened and prospered due to its isolated location on the route. By 1940, Amboy's population had increased to 65. Its growth was tied not only to tourists, but also to the Santa Fe Railroad over which freight trains still run today between Kingman, Arizona and the BNSF Railway Barstow, California yard.

During the Great Depression and World War II, tourism declined nationally. But the remaining travelers' need for lodging, meals and gasoline kept the town busy. The town remained this way until the opening of Interstate 40 in 1973, which bypassed Amboy.

Attractions

Nearby craters

Two extinct volcanoes are located to the west of Amboy. Amboy Crater is a 6,000-year-old cinder cone volcano, made largely of pahoehoe lava. Pisgah Crater, another cinder cone volcano, is located near Interstate 40. Because of quarry operations, Pisgah Crater is not as well preserved as Amboy Crater.

Roy's Motel and Café

Roy's Motel and Café was the only gasoline, food and lodging stop for miles around that part of the eastern Mojave and was well known for both its Googie "retro-future" architecture added to one of the original buildings and even more famous sign, a 1959 addition. Both Roy's and the surrounding town were once owned by Buster Burris, one of Route 66's most famous characters who purchased Roy's from his father-in-law Roy Crowl, the man for whom the property is named, in 1938 and ran the town until 1995.

In 1938, Roy Crowl opened "Roy's" as a service station on Route 66 in Amboy. Roy, together with his wife Velma, owned the town. In the 1940s Roy teamed up with Herman "Buster" Burris who married his daughter Betty. Together they expanded the business, keeping it open 24 hours a day and adding the motel to the service station and café. Business boomed in the deluge of motor tourists after World War II.

The routing of the old National Trails Highway (1914) and its better-traveled successor, Route 66 through Amboy saw a steady growth of business, especially at Roy's. The complex was so busy during summer vacation that Burris placed classified ads in other states to bring in employees.

Buster sold the town in 1995, and moved to Twentynine Palms where he died in 2000. The town was owned by investors Walt Wilson and Tim White who mainly used it for photo shots and to host movie companies. After the two lost it in foreclosure, it was repossessed by Bessie Burris, Buster's widow. Bessie sold the property in February 2005 to Albert Okura, owner of the Juan Pollo restaurant chain, who offered $425,000 in cash and promised to preserve the town and reopen Roy's.

The deal included about 490 acres, including the town as well as Amboy and Route 66 landmark Roy's Motel and Café, the church, post office, three gas pumps, two dirt airstrips and other buildings in the town. Okura also plans to open a museum, much like he has with the original McDonald's location in San Bernardino, turning it into an unofficial museum.

Okura reportedly got the idea of buying a town from the real estate agent who sold him his first home, who shared that he regretted not buying a town when he had the opportunity and recounts the story in his book, Albert Okura: The Chicken Man with a 50 Year Plan. Unlike Timothy White and Walt Wilson, who bought (and later defaulted on) the town and Roy's Motel and Cafe prior to Okura's purchase and marketed the town as a ghost-town location for film and television productions, Okura plans on restoring the town for Route 66 tourists and sees the purchase of the town as part of his "destiny".

On April 28, 2008, Roy's reopened. The renovations and repairs cost $100,000. Albert Okura also planned to open a café and mini-mart at the same location; as of 2014, the restaurant remains closed for lack of an adequate potable water supply. As of 2015 the motel is closed as well. A gift shop is open in the café, and gas is available on request. The motel has been used as a stage for art exhibits.

Roy's has attracted some well-known regulars. Actors Harrison Ford and Anthony Hopkins have autographed photos on the walls of the restaurant and visit whenever their schedules allow. Ford frequently flies in and lands his plane on a nearby landing strip, one of the first ever built in California.

Amboy School
The former Amboy School is adjacent to Roy's. The school closed in 1999 after the last students moved away.

Popular culture

Part of the 1986 film The Hitcher with Rutger Hauer was filmed in Amboy. Roy's was the setting for a 1999 television commercial for Qwest Communications. It was also used in Enrique Iglesias' music video "Hero" and the film Live Evil. The town's former owners Walt Wilson and Timothy White maintained Amboy in weathered, unrestored condition for use as a motion picture film site.

In 1993, Huell Howser visited Amboy during episode 410 of California's Gold as part of his ongoing series visiting interesting areas of California. During the episode, he interviewed Buster Burris, the owner of Roy's. The episode was aired on December 3, 1993, and also showed Wonder Valley in the Morongo Basin and the Amboy Crater.

A fictional version of Amboy complete with Roy's Hotel and sign was part of Ivan's rig and roll map for 18 Wheels of Steel Haulin'.

See also

 Bristol Dry Lake
 List of ghost towns in California

References

External links

 
 Artists photo study of Amboy 2007
 History, historic photos and rental information
 Roy's in Amboy, California Featured in J.Crew Catalog
 Virtual Field with Pisgah Crater 
 Roys Café Restoration Project
 Amboy at Modern Day Ruins
Amboy Airfield

Populated places in the Mojave Desert
Unincorporated communities in San Bernardino County, California
Populated places established in 1883
Ghost towns on U.S. Route 66